The Syrian men's national volleyball team represents Syria in international volleyball competitions and friendly matches. As of 27 July 2022, the team was ranked 143th in the world.

Competition record

Asian Championship

AVC Cup for Men 

Did not participate

AVC Challenge Cup

Did not participate

Arab Championship

1980: 
1992:

Afro-Arab Volleyball Friendship Cup

1981: 5th - 10th place

Asian games 

Did not qualify

West Asian Games

Mediterranean Games

Pan Arab Games

Islamic Solidarity Games

See also
Syria women's national volleyball team

References

National men's volleyball teams
National sports teams of Syria
1948 establishments in Syria
National sports teams established in 1948
Sport in Syria
Volleyball in Syria